Falisci is the ancient Roman exonym for an Italic tribe who lived in what is now northern Lazio, on the Etruscan side of the Tiber River. They spoke an Italic language, Faliscan, closely akin to Latin. Originally a sovereign state, politically and socially they supported the Etruscans, joining the Etruscan League. This conviction and affiliation led to their ultimate near destruction and total subjugation by Rome.

Only one instance of their own endonym has been found to date: an inscription from Falerii Novi from the late 2nd century AD refers to the falesce quei in Sardinia sunt, "the Faliscans who are in Sardinia", where falesce is the nominative plural case. An Etruscan inscription calls them the feluskeś. The Latin cannot be far different from the original name. The -sc- suffix is "distinctive of the Italic ethnonyms".

Geography
The Falisci resided in a region called by the Romans the Ager Faliscus, "Faliscan Country", located on the right bank of the Tiber River between and including Grotta Porciosa in the north and Capena in the south. To the west, the corners of the roughly square area were on the slopes of the Monti Sabatini in the south and the Monti Cimini in the north. Pollen samples from Lake Bracciano, Lake Monterosi and Lake Vico reveal that the montane forests, formed by oaks, were very dense until the 2nd century BC.

The arable land was contained within an enclosure of volcanic highlands and the Tiber River. The northern border of the enclosure went along the ridge of the Monti Cimini, the southern along the ridge connecting the Monti Sabatini and Monte Soratte, the western along the highlands connecting the two large volcanic lakes. The inner slopes are drained by streams pointing at the Tiber, which collect into converging canyons and finally into the canyon of the Treja River, which empties into the Tiber. These streams required an extensive network of bridges.

Most of the through traffic went along the Via Tiburtina on the west bank of the river, which could only be crossed south of Capena or at Grotta Porciosa in the north. There the Via Flaminia, earlier the Via Amerina, led inland into the country of the Sabines via the valley of the Nar River. On the western side, the Via Cassia or its predecessor led to the coast over Sutri gap. The Falisci therefore prospered by being on a protected crossroad.

Their most important centre was Falerii, which became known as Falerii Veteres after the Romans moved them to a less defensible position, Falerii Novi. Both locations are near the modern Civita Castellana. They also had Fescennium. Archaeologists have discovered other major municipalities, unmentioned by the ancient sources, at Corchiano, Vignanello, Gallese and Grotta Porciosa.

Culture

In spite of the Etruscan domination, the Faliscans preserved many traces of their Italic origin, such as the worship of the deities Juno Quiritis, Feronia, the cult of the god Soranus by the Hirpi or fire-leaping priests on Mount Soracte, above all their language.

History
The Falisci, often allied with the Etruscans, resisted Rome for a long time. They were allied with Veii when it was defeated in 396 BC. In the aftermath, Falerii was occupied by the victorious Romans. When, in 358, Tarquinia rebelled, the Falisci again took arms against Rome, but were again crushed c. 351 BC. This time an alliance was signed between the contenders, and a Roman garrison was settled in Falerii.

The Falisci took advantage of the First Punic War to declare their independence, but their revolt ended in 241 BC with the death of 15,000 Falisci and the destruction of Falerii; the survivors were moved to a less defensible city, Falerii Novi.

Language

The Faliscan language, the Italic language of the ancient Falisci, attested by the 7th century B.C. is an Indo-European language. Together with Latin, it forms the Latino-Faliscan languages group of the Italic languages. It seems probable that the language persisted, being gradually permeated with Latin, until at least 150 BC.

See also
 Faliscan language
 Etruria

Notes

Further reading
 Carlucci, Claudia. Villa Giulia Museum: The Antiquities of the Faliscans. Rome: L'Erma di Bretschneider, 1998.
 De Lucia Brolli, Maria Anna and Jacopo Tabolli. "The Faliscans and the Etruscans." In The Etruscan World, edited by Jean MacIntosh Turfa, 259–280. London: Routledge, 2013.
 Holland, Louise Adams. The Faliscans in Prehistoric Times. Rome: American Academy in Rome, 1925.
 Potter, T. W. A Faliscan Town in South Etruria: Excavations at Narce 1966-71. London: British School at Rome, 1976.

Sources

 

 
Ancient Italic peoples